Nabovat Rural District is a rural district (dehestan) in the Central District of Eyvan County, Ilam Province, Iran. At the 2006 census, its population was 6,416, in 1,258 families.  The rural district has 23 villages.

References 

Rural Districts of Ilam Province
Eyvan County